Delvin Rumbino (born 3 June 1995), is an Indonesian professional footballer who plays as a midfielder for Liga 1 club PSIS Semarang.

Club career

Perseru Serui
In 2018, Rumbino joined Liga 1 club Perseru Serui. He made his debut on 25 March 2018 in a match against Persebaya Surabaya. On 31 July 2018, Rumbino scored his first goal for Perseru in the 93rd minute against Persebaya Surabaya.

Persela Lamongan
In 2019, Rumbino joined Liga 1 club Persela Lamongan. He made his debut on 17 May 2019 in a match against Madura United. On 15 November 2019, Rumbino scored his first goal for Persela in the 43rd minute against Persija Jakarta.

Barito Putera
He was signed for Barito Putera to play in Liga 1 in the 2020 season. This season was suspended on 27 March 2020 due to the COVID-19 pandemic. The season was abandoned and was declared void on 20 January 2021.

Persis Solo
In 2021, Rumbino signed a contract with Indonesian Liga 2 club Persis Solo. He made first 2021–22 Liga 2 debut on 26 September 2021, coming on as a starter in a 2–0 win against Bekasi City at the Manahan Stadium, Surakarta.

PSM Makassar (loan)
In 2022, Rumbino signed a contract with Indonesian Liga 1 club PSM Makassar, on loan from Persis Solo. He made his league debut on 8 January 2022 in a match against Madura United at the Ngurah Rai Stadium, Denpasar.

PSIS Semarang
Rumbino officially joined PSIS Semarang for the 2022–23 Liga 1 competition. He made first 2022–23 Liga 1 debut on 23 July 2022 in a match against RANS Nusantara at the Jatidiri Stadium, Semarang.

Honours

Club
Persis Solo
 Liga 2: 2021

References

External links
 Delvin Rumbino at Soccerway

1995 births
People from Biak Numfor Regency
Papuan people
Living people
Indonesian footballers
Association football midfielders
PSBS Biak Numfor players
Perseru Serui players
Persela Lamongan players
PS Barito Putera players
Persis Solo players
PSM Makassar players
PSIS Semarang players
Liga 2 (Indonesia) players
Liga 1 (Indonesia) players
Sportspeople from Papua